Malta were represented at the 2009 Mediterranean Games by forty-three athletes, who competed in 10 different sporting disciplines.

References

Nations at the 2009 Mediterranean Games
2009
Mediterranean Games